Jowzar-e Javid (also Romanized as Jowzār-e Jāvīd, Jow Zār Jāvīd, Jūzār-e Jāvīd, and Jūzār Jāvīd; also known as Jāveh, Jāvi, Jāvīd, and Jowzār) is a village in Jowzar Rural District, in the Central District of Mamasani County, Fars Province, Iran. At the 2006 census, its population was 424, in 115 families.

References 

Populated places in Mamasani County